The ease of doing business index was an index created jointly by Simeon Djankov, Michael Klein, and Caralee McLiesh, three leading economists at the World Bank Group, following the release of World Development Report 2002. The academic research for the report was done jointly with professors Edward Glaeser, Oliver Hart, and Andrei Shleifer. Though the first report was authored by Djankov, Klein, and McLiesh, and they continue to be listed as "founders" of the report, some sources attribute the genesis of the idea to Djankov and Gerhard Pohl. Higher rankings (a low numerical value) indicated better, usually simpler, regulations for businesses and stronger protections of property rights. Empirical research funded by the World Bank to justify their work show that the economic growth effect of improving these regulations is strong.

"World Development Report 2002", the basis of the research behind Doing Business, analyzes how to build effective institutions. In understanding what drives institutional change, the report emphasizes the importance of history, highlighting the need to ensure effective institutions through a design that complements existing institutions, human capabilities, and available technologies. The study was guided by Joseph Stiglitz and Roumeen Islam with principal authors Simeon Dyankov and Aart Kraay. Several background papers, including by Nobel Prize winners Robert Shiller, Amartya Sen and Gabriel Garcia Marquez, were published in academic journals or books.

The report was discontinued by the World Bank on September 14, 2021, following an audit documenting how bank leadership pressured experts to manipulate the results of the 2018 and 2020 reports. Several organizations have proposed replacements, including the Antigua Forum, the World Bank, and the Fraser Institute.

The World Bank announced in December 2022 that it would be releasing the methodology for the replacement to the index in the second quarter of 2023.

Methodology 
The report was a benchmark study of regulation. The survey consisted of a questionnaire designed by the Doing Business team with the assistance of academic advisers. The questionnaire centered on a simple business case that ensures comparability across economies and over time. The survey also based assumptions on the legal form of the business, size, location, and nature of its operations. The ease of doing business index was meant to measure regulations directly affecting businesses and did not directly measure more general conditions such as a nation's proximity to large markets, quality of infrastructure, inflation, or crime.

The next step was gathering data surveys of over 12,500 expert contributors (lawyers, accountants, etc.) in 190 countries who deal with business regulations in their day-to-day work. These individuals interacted with the Doing Business team in conference calls, written correspondence, and visits by the global team. For the 2017 report, team members visited 34 economies to verify data and to recruit respondents. Data from the survey was subjected to several rounds of verification. The surveys were not a statistical sample, and the results were interpreted and cross-checked for consistency before being included in the report. Results were also validated with the relevant government before publication. Respondents filled out written surveys and provided references to the relevant laws, regulations, and fees based on standardized case scenarios with specific assumptions, such as the business being located in the largest business city of the economy.

A nation's ranking on the index was based on an average of 10 subindices:
Starting a business – Procedures, time, cost, and minimum capital to open a new business
Dealing with construction permits – Procedures, time, and cost to build a warehouse
Getting electricity – procedures, time, and cost required for a business to obtain a permanent electricity connection for a newly constructed warehouse
Registering property – Procedures, time, and cost to register commercial real estate
Getting credit – Strength of legal rights index, depth of credit information index
Protecting investors – Indices on the extent of disclosure, the extent of director liability, and ease of shareholder suits
Paying taxes – Number of taxes paid, hours per year spent preparing tax returns, and total tax payable as a share of gross profit
Trading across borders – Number of documents, cost, and time necessary to export and import
Enforcing contracts – Procedures, time, and cost to enforce a debt contract
Resolving insolvency – The time, cost, and recovery rate (%) under a bankruptcy proceeding
The Doing Business project also offers information on the following datasets:
 Distance to the frontier – Shows the distance of each economy to the "frontier," which represents the highest performance observed on each of the indicators across all economies included since each indicator was included in Doing Business
 Good practices – Provide insights into how governments have improved the regulatory environment in the past in the areas measured by Doing Business

For example, according to the Doing Business (DB) 2013 report, Canada ranked third on the first subindex "Starting a business" behind only New Zealand and Australia. In Canada, there is 1 procedure required to start a business which takes on average 5 days to complete. The official cost is 0.4% of the gross national income per capita. There was no minimum capital requirement. By contrast, in Chad which ranked among the worst (181st out of 185) on this same subindex, there were 9 procedures required to start a business taking 62 days to complete. The official cost was 202% of the gross national income per capita. A minimum capital investment of 289.4% of the gross national income per capita is required.

While fewer and simpler regulations often imply higher rankings, this was not always the case. Protecting the rights of creditors and investors, as well as establishing or upgrading property and credit registries, may mean that more regulation is needed.

In most indicators, the case study referred to a small domestically-owned manufacturing company—hence the direct relevance of the indicators to foreign investors and large companies is limited. DB uses a simple averaging approach for weighting sub-indicators and calculating rankings. A detailed explanation of every indicator can be found through the DB website and a .xls archive that simulates reforms.

Some caveats regarding the rankings and main information presented have to be considered by every user of the report. Mainly:

 Doing Business did not measure all aspects of the business environment that matter to firms or investors, such as the macroeconomic conditions, or the level of employment, corruption, stability, or poverty, in every country.
 Doing Business did not consider the strengths and weaknesses of neither the global financial system, nor the financial system of every country. It also doesn't consider the state of the finances of the government of every country.
 Doing Business does not cover all the regulations or all the regulatory requirements. Other types of regulation such as financial market, environment, or intellectual property regulations that are relevant for the private sector are not considered.
The Doing Business report was not intended as a complete assessment of competitiveness or the business environment of a country and should rather be considered as a proxy of the regulatory framework faced by the private sector in a country.

History 
The Doing Business report has its origins in a 2002 paper published in the Quarterly Journal of Economics by Simeon Djankov, Rafael La Porta, Florencio Lopez-de-Silanes and Andrei Shleifer under the title "The Regulation of Entry". The study presents data on the regulation of entry of start-up firms in 85 countries covering the number of procedures, official time and official cost that a start-up must bear before it can operate legally. The main findings of the paper are that: "Countries with heavier regulation of entry have higher corruption and larger unofficial economies, but no better quality of public or private goods. Countries with more democratic and limited governments have lighter regulation of entry." The paper became widely known, with over five thousand academic references, because it provides quantitative evidence that entry regulation benefits politicians and bureaucrats without adding value to the private sector or granting any additional protection.

Several countries have launched reforms to improve their rankings. These efforts are motivated to a great scope by the fact that the World Bank Group publishes the data, and hence coverage by the media and the private sector every year. Also, Doing Business highlights every year the successful reforms carried out by each country. The Regulation of Entry was published, Simeon Djankov and Andrei Shleifer have published nine other academic studies, one for each set of indicators covered by the report.

Over 18 years, 2003 to 2020, the reports recorded nearly 5,000 regulatory reforms implemented by 190 economies.

 Poland was the global top improver in the past year. It enhanced the ease of doing business through four institutional or regulatory reforms, making it easier to register property, pay taxes, enforce contracts, and resolve insolvency.
 Worldwide, 108 economies implemented 201 regulatory reforms in 2011/12 making it easier to do business as measured by Doing Business. Reform efforts globally have focused on making it easier to start a new business, increasing the efficiency of tax administration, and facilitating trade across international borders. Of the 201 regulatory reforms recorded in the past year, 44% focused on these 3 policy areas alone.
 Singapore topped the global ranking on the ease of doing business for the seventh consecutive year, followed by Hong Kong SAR; New Zealand; the United States; and Denmark. Georgia was a new entrant to the top 10.
In 2014 Doing Business covered regulations measured from June 2012 through May 2013 in 189 economies.

 Singapore is the first economy of the global ranking followed by Hong Kong SAR, New Zealand, the United States, Denmark, Malaysia, South Korea, Georgia, Norway, and the United Kingdom.
 For the first time data about Libya, Myanmar, San Marino, and South Sudan were collected.
114 economies adopted 238 regulatory reforms in 2012/13 (the reforms increased by 18% compared to the previous year).
In 2015, Doing Business covered regulations measured from June 2013 through June 2014 in 189 economies. For the first time this year, Doing Business collected data for 2 cities in 11 economies with more than 100 million inhabitants. These economies include Bangladesh, Brazil, China, India, Indonesia, Japan, Mexico, Nigeria, Pakistan, the Russian Federation, and the United States. The added city enables a sub-national comparison and benchmarking against other large cities.

In 2021, the World Bank discontinued the Doing Business Report following allegations of irregularities, data manipulation, undue influence, and unethical behavior by bank staff including Djankov, former World Bank president Jim Yong Kim, and IMF managing director Kristalina Georgieva.

Research and influence
As stated in the report, "Empirical research is needed to establish the optimal level of business regulation—for example, what the duration of court procedures should be and what the optimal degree of social protection is. The indicators compiled in the Doing Business project allow such research to take place. Since the start of the project in November 2001, more than 3,000 academic papers have used one or more indicators constructed in Doing Business and the related background papers by its authors." An example of such empirical research is a paper on business regulation and poverty, published in Economics Letters.

More than 3,000 academic papers used data from the index. The effect of improving regulations on economic growth is claimed to be very strong. Moving from the worst one-fourth of nations to the best one-fourth implies a 2.3 percentage point increase in annual growth. Another 7,000 working papers in economics and social science departments use the data from the Doing Business report. The 2016 Nobel Prize Winner in Economics Oliver Hart is among the authors of such papers.

The various sub-components of the index in themselves provided concrete suggestions for improvement. Many of them may have been relatively easy to implement and uncontroversial (except perhaps among corrupt officials who may gain from onerous regulations requiring bribes to bypass). As such, the index has influenced many nations to improve their regulations. Several have explicitly targeted to reach a minimum position on the index, for example, the top 25 list. To consider the element of corruption and transparency in the economy, the index has also been combined with the Corruption Perceptions Index in the annual Best European Countries for Business publication.

Somewhat similar annual reports are the Indices of Economic Freedom and the Global Competitiveness Report. They, especially the latter, look at many more factors that affect economic growth, like inflation and infrastructure. These factors may however be more subjective and diffuse, since many are measured using surveys and they may be more difficult to change quickly compared to regulations.

A November 2017 EconTalk podcast explains the lasting influence in academia and policy circles of the Doing Business report.

Doing Business Report
The Doing Business Report (DB) was an annually published report which was developed by a team led by Djankov in 2003. It was published by the World Bank Group every year from 2003 to 2019 and aimed to measure the costs to firms of business regulations in 190 countries. The study was one of the flagship knowledge products of the World Bank Group in the field of private sector development and is claimed to have motivated the design of several regulatory reforms in developing countries. The study presented every year a detailed analysis of costs, requirements, and procedures a specific type of private firm is subject in all countries, and then, creates rankings for every country. The study is also backed up by broad communication efforts, and by creating rankings, the study spotlights countries and leaders that are promoting reforms.

The DB was widely known and used by academics, policy-makers, politicians, development experts, journalists, and the business community to highlight red tape and promote reforms. As stated by the IEG study from the World Bank: "For country authorities, it sheds a bright, sometimes unflattering, light on regulatory aspects of their business climate. For business interests, it has helped to catalyze debates and dialogue about reform. For the World Bank Group, it demonstrates an ability to provide global knowledge, independent of resource transfer and conditionality. The annual exercise generates information that is relevant and useful".According to the DB, the regulation does matter for the development of the private sectors, and several reforms are suggested across the report to promote the development of the private sector and enable the business environment. Some highlighted findings of the DB are:
 Lower barriers to start-up are associated with a smaller informal sector.
 Lower costs of entry encourage entrepreneurship, enhance firm productivity, and reduce corruption.
 Simple start-up translates into greater employment opportunities.

Contents
In 2017, the study contains quantitative measures of regulations for starting a business, dealing with construction permits, employing workers, registering property, getting credit, protecting investors, taxes, trading across borders, enforcing contracts, getting an electricity connection, and closing a business. As stated in the introduction of the study, "A fundamental premise of DB is that economic activity requires good rules. These include rules that establish and clarify property rights and reduce the costs of resolving disputes, rules that increase the predictability of economic interactions, and rules that provide contractual partners with core protections against abuse."

Evaluation
Doing Business was a controversial study, with passionate critics and devoted fans. As recognized by the Independent Evaluation Group of the World Bank, some have questioned the reliability and objectivity of its measurements while others doubt the relevance of the issues it addresses or fears it may unduly dominate countries reform agendas at the expense of more crucial development objectives. Attention given to the indicators may inadvertently signal that the World Bank Group values less burdensome business regulations more highly than its other strategies for poverty reduction and sustainable development.

Several limitations were present in the DB studies and have to be kept in mind when using the study:

 The indicators and measures were referred to the costs, requirements, and fees of doing business in the country's largest business city; thus conditions elsewhere within the country may have differed.
 To achieve cross-country standardization respondents were asked to give estimates for a limited liability company of a specific size. Costs for other forms and scales of businesses may have differed.
 Transactions and fees to have cost out were very specifically defined. The costs of other types of transactions may differ.
 The cost estimates come from individuals identified as expert respondents. Sometimes the estimates given by such individuals may differ with other experts and with public officials. If so, the responses are cross-checked for consistency.
 The estimates assumed that a business knows what is required and does not waste time. Satisfying regulatory requirements will take longer if the business lacks information or is unable to follow up promptly. A related point here is that DB does not allow for "workarounds", "facilitating fees", and "learning time" that speed or delay approvals and causes variation costs.

Related studies

Published for seventeen years, the DB has originated a growing body of research on how performance on DB indicators, and reforms generated by the reports, related to specific development desirable outcomes. As stated by the DB 2010, about "405 articles have been published in peer-reviewed academic journals, and about 1143 working papers are available through Google Scholar".

DB was widely used as a study to measure competitiveness. However, regulation rather than competitiveness is the main objective in the DB. Other studies that are also used to measure competitiveness and recognized as business enabling environment ranking systems are the Global Competitiveness Index, the Index of Economic Freedom, and the Global Entrepreneurship Monitor, among others.

Controversies

2018 manipulation scandal
On 12 January 2018, Paul Romer, the World Bank's chief economist, announced that past releases of the index would be corrected and recalculated going back at least four years. Romer apologized to Chile, saying that the former director of the group responsible for the index had repeatedly manipulated its methodology, unfairly penalizing the country's rankings during the administration of left-wing President Michelle Bachelet. In response, Bachelet announced that Chile would formally request a complete investigation by the World Bank.

The 2021 WilmerHale report (see below) revealed that there were more extensive data irregularities in the 2018 report, specifically the manipulation of China's data.

2020 data irregularities controversy
Several major newspapers – including the Financial Times, The Economist, and The Wall Street Journal – report that the data of China, Azerbaijan, United Arab Emirates, and Saudi Arabia among others were suspected to be "inappropriately altered" in the 2020 Doing Business publication. In light of the data irregularities found in both the 2018 and 2020 reports, the World Bank announced on 27 August 2020 that it would pause the Doing Business publication while it conducts a review of data changes for the last five reports and an internal audit of data integrity.

Following these revelations, some organizations paused the use of Doing Business data, and supplemented these reports with data from alternative indicators measuring the same concepts. On December 16, 2020, the World Bank released 3 reports about the conclusions of the reviews examining the data irregularities:

 A review of the specific irregularities identified.
 An independent confirmation of these irregularities.
 An independent review of Doing Business's processes for data production and management.

These reviews found that, while the specific issues uncovered in this breach had been addressed, a culture where management pressured experts to manipulate data persisted: "The DB team members reported undue pressure, both directly and indirectly by Bank management to manipulate data in 2017 during the 2018 report production process and in 2019 during the 2020 report production process. The lack of a safe speak-up environment within the DB team led to a fear of retaliation for those who would escalate and report pressures to manipulate data. This contributed to the compromise of data integrity in the DB report." These reports also found that over half of Doing Business staff interviewed admitted to manipulating data.

Cancellation and Fallout 
In September 2021, the World Bank discontinued the Doing Business report following the release of an independent report detailing the specifics of the 2020 and 2018 irregularities, including detailed explanations of how senior leaders at the bank manipulated data and pressured experts to change rankings and methodology to improve scores for certain countries.

The report from WilmerHale provided details on the 2018 and 2020 manipulation scandals, implicating the then-president of the Bank Jim Yong Kim, the then-CEO of the Bank Kristalina Georgieva, and one of the founders of the report Simeon Djankov, in data manipulation for the purposes of raising the scores of some countries (China and Saudi Arabia) and reducing the scores of others (Azerbaijan). In 2018 in an effort to secure funding from China, Kim, Georgieva, and Djankov repeatedly pressured the team that creates the data to pursue multiple avenues to improve China's score, eventually resorting to having members of the team unlock the report and change three of China's data points after the scores had been finalized. Georgieva issued a statement disagreeing with the characterization of her actions in the report.

According to the report, in 2020 Djankov pressured the Doing Business team to change Saudi Arabia's score in an effort to rank better than Jordan due to extensive Reimbursable Advisory Services contracts between the Bank and Saudi Arabia.  The subsequent change in methodology also lead to the UAE improving in score but not overall ranking. Also in 2020, Djankov ordered a review of three of Azerbaijan's data points.  The team reviewed these data points and concluded that they were accurate.  Djankov ignored these recommendations and changed Azerbaijan's score, also altering the overall methodology of the report to ensure that Azerbaijan scored lower.

Beyond these allegations, the report documents a culture of pressure from the highest levels of World Bank management, particularly under the leadership of Djankov.  According to the report "nearly every Doing Business employee with whom we spoke described the environment on the Doing Business team under the management of Mr. Djankov to be, at best, deeply problematic, and, at worse, emotionally harrowing.  Employees said that Mr. Djankov was a  “bully”  who instilled fear on the team;  that he managed  “by terror and intimidation”; that his management style constituted “psychological terrorism” that created a “toxic environment”; that he was a “larger than life fear factor” for everyone on the team; and that his management style was pompous and undiplomatic."The report also documents the culture of fear that prevented employees from reporting these irregularities, with Djankov threatening retaliation against anyone that threatened his authority, and "dangled promotions in front of Doing Business leadership to incentivize compliance with his personal objectives."

Response to the WilmerHale Report 
Following these reports, various agencies expressed concern about the allegations and their effect on the world's faith in data produced by the World Bank. US Treasury Secretary Janet Yellen called for strong action to prevent misconduct and strengthen data integrity. Other US agencies called the report "serious and troubling" and quickly replaced data from the Doing Business report with other sources.

When these allegations came to light, Georgieva was serving as the managing director of the International Monetary Fund.  The IMF's board reviewed the allegations, but found that the report "did not conclusively demonstrate" that she engaged in data manipulation.  The US government refused to publicly support Georgieva, but did not call for her removal.

Response to Report Cancellation 

The cancellation of the report led to a range of responses from academics and think tanks, with some claiming that its cancellation was long overdue, and others arguing it was an overreaction. According to Frédéric Mousseau, the policy director for the progressive Oakland Institute "Even before the extent of the data manipulation came to light and destroyed any credibility of the DBR, the rankings had been built on a flawed premise that rewards countries for reducing their labor standards, destroying the environment, and providing easy access for corporate pillaging and land grabs." The senior director of policy and research for the Cicero Institute, noted corruption like this is common at multilateral institutions like the World Bank, "Multilateral institutions like the World Bank are particularly susceptible to such forces. Their structures ensure that each government gets a say, while no one government is held accountable. When Georgieva thanked a data manipulator for doing his “bit for multilateralism,” she was more right than she knew. Like many supposedly not-for-profit international organizations, the World Bank also found ways to peddle its influence. It began selling “Reimbursable Advisory Services” to countries that wanted to improve their ranking on the index."

Others criticized the cancellation of the report. Professor Robert Lawson, Fullinwider Chair in Economic Freedom at Southern Methodist University described this decision as "throwing the baby out with the bathwater." According to Ian Vasquez, director for policy at the Cato Institute, a US-based libertarian think tank:"It was a serious mistake for the World Bank to discontinue the Doing Business report. It did so out of concerns about data irregularities for two years affecting four countries. Instead of instituting sensible, new measures on process and methodology as recommended by the firm that conducted an independent review for the World Bank, the bank chose to scrap the Doing Business report altogether. From the outside, it very much looks like the decade‐​long campaign by critics of market‐​oriented policies finally triumphed."

Reception 
The Doing Business methodology regarding labor regulations was criticized by the International Trade Union Confederation because it favored flexible employment regulations. In early reports, the easier it was to dismiss a worker for economic reasons in a country, the more its rankings improved. The Employing Workers index was revised in Doing Business 2008 to be in full compliance with the 188 International Labour Organization conventions. It has subsequently been removed from the rankings. The ITUC debuted the Global Rights Index in 2014 as a response to the Doing Business report.

In 2008 the World Bank Group's Independent Evaluation Group, a semi-independent watchdog within the World Bank Group, published an evaluation of the Doing Business index. The report, Doing Business: An Independent Evaluation, contained both praise and criticism of Doing Business. The report recommended that the index be clearer about what is and is not measured, disclose changes to published data, recruit more informants, and simplify the Paying Taxes indicator.

In April 2009 the World Bank issued a note with revisions to the Employing Workers index. The note explained that scoring for the "Employing Workers" indicator would be updated in Doing Business 2010 to give favorable scores for complying with relevant ILO conventions. The Employing Workers indicator was also removed as a guidepost for Country Policy and Institutional Assessments, which help determine resources provided to IDA countries.

A study commissioned by the Norwegian government alleges methodological weaknesses, an uncertainty in the ability of the indicators to capture the underlying business climate and a concern that countries may find it easier to change their ranking in Doing Business than to change the underlying business environment.

In 2013, an independent panel appointed by the President of the World Bank and headed by Trevor Manuel of South Africa issued a review expressing concern about the potential for the report and index to be misinterpreted, and the narrowness of the indicators and information base. It recommended that the report be retained, but that the aggregate rankings be removed and that a peer-review process is implemented (among other things). Regarding the topics of Paying Taxes and Employing Workers, it noted that "The latter has already been excluded from the report's rankings. While there is a persuasive case for paying attention to these aspects of doing business, the Bank will need to carefully consider the correct way to assess the regulation and legal environment of these areas if these indicators are to be retained."

In 2018, another independent evaluation, was commissioned by the World Bank Group. The evaluation praised the Doing Business report for its objectivity and focus on regulatory reform. It suggested adding peer-reviewed research papers behind every set of indicators. Subsequently, the World Bank has added one such research article, underlying the indicator on property registration.

Ranking 
The last published rankings came from the "Doing Business 2020" report. Ranking of economies was introduced in the "Doing Business 2006" report.

New Zealand topped the Ease of Doing Business rankings in 2017, 2018, 2019, and 2020.

Singapore topped the Ease of Doing Business rankings in 2007–2016. Based on Singapore's experience, IDA International is collaborating with public agencies in several countries in the areas such as ICT strategy, national Infocomm planning and solutions implementation that can help increase the ease of doing business. One interesting fact is that although richer countries on average are ranked higher than poor countries, there are some remarkable exceptions, particularly oil-rich countries. For example, Kuwait (ranked 83), Qatar (ranked 77), Oman (ranked 68) Saudi Arabia (ranked 62). Compare to lower-income countries: India (ranked 63), Kenya (ranked 56), Colombia (ranked 67), Uzbekistan (ranked 69). Notable exceptions are Norway (ranked 9) and the United Arab Emirates (ranked 16).

China's 2018 ranking, and 2020 rankings of the UAE and Saudi Arabia are alleged to have been artificially strengthened by an internal audit of the rankings. In contrast, Azerbaijan's 2019 ranking is alleged to have been artificially lowered.

* – same rank is for multiple jurisdictions 
** –  the State Union of Serbia and Montenegro

Note: Rankings at the time of annual report publication. Rankings are subject to revision.

See also
 Index of Economic Freedom
 List of countries by economic freedom
 Corruption Perceptions Index
 List of freedom indices
 Simeon Dyankov

References

External links

List of Global Development Indexes and Rankings 
Sub-indices:
Starting a business
Dealing with construction permits
Getting electricity

2002 establishments
2021 disestablishments
World Bank
Business law
Administrative law
Economic indicators
International rankings